Gilbert Agnew Hunt, Jr. (March 4, 1916 – May 30, 2008) was an American  mathematician and amateur tennis player active in the 1930s and 1940s.

Early life and education
Hunt was born in Washington, D.C. and attended Eastern High School.

Tennis career
Hunt reached the quarterfinals of the U.S. National Championships in 1938 and 1939.

Scientific career 
Hunt received his bachelor's degree from George Washington University in 1938 and his Ph.D. from Princeton University in 1948 under Salomon Bochner. Hunt became a mathematics professor at Princeton University specializing in probability theory, Markov processes, and potential theory.

The Hunt process is named after him. He was an Invited Speaker at the ICM in 1962 in Stockholm. His doctoral students include Robert McCallum Blumenthal and Richard M. Dudley.

Hunt's theorem

Selected publications

with Paul Erdős:

References

External links 

 Kitta MacPherson, Gilbert Hunt, probability expert, dies at 92, «Princeton Weekly Bulletin» June 16, 2008, Vol. 97, No. 29.
 
 
 Gilbert Agnew Hunt, Jr. - Dolph Briscoe Center for American History

1916 births
2008 deaths
People from Washington, D.C.
American male tennis players
George Washington University alumni
Princeton University alumni
Probability theorists
Cornell University faculty
Princeton University faculty
 Eastern High School (Washington, D.C.) alumni